Caricelea is a genus of spiders in the family Trechaleidae. It was first described in 2007 by Silva & Lise. , it contains 3 species, all from Peru.

References

Trechaleidae
Araneomorphae genera
Spiders of South America